Miriam Odemba (born 1983) (from Arusha, Tanzania) is a Tanzanian model. She started her modeling career at an early age and gained fame when she won the Miss Temeke title in 1997. The following year at age of 15 she took part at Miss East Africa 1998 and in the modeling competition M-Net Face of Africa 1998 becoming a runner up. She later participated at Elite Model Look 1999 contest and Miss Earth 2008 where she was crowned as Miss Earth – Air 2008.

At 13, her life was tough and her parents had to move to their uncle.  She always wondered what life was all about then. As she grew older, she perceived God’s message of love and started appreciating everything around her especially the nature, God’s greatest gift to not only to her but to all of us.

The path to success for Miriam started back in 1997 when she first competed in a local beauty pageant Miss Temeke at age of 14. She went on to compete nationally for the Miss Tanzania crown but ended up in the Top 10 and was not able to win the crown. However this was not the end but the beginning for her who tried her luck at several beauty pageants including Miss East Africa in 1998. However Miriam Odemba got her break at the end of 1998 when she took part in an African regional model search – Mnet Face of Africa 1998 and becoming one of the runners-up.
In 1999 at age of 16 she was selected as Elite Model Look Tanzania, and competed at Elite Model Look 1999 in Nice, France placing among the Top 17 and also got an exclusive contract with Elite Model Management in New York city. However, due to personal problems and the sudden loss of her manager Amina Mongi, her contract with Elite ended without implementation.

Miriam struck out on a new path in entertainment and worked briefly in modeling and dancing in China and she also took part in the Miss Kite beauty pageant in 2001. Despite Not winning, she later she launched her modeling career in Europe and Asia.

Miss Earth 2008

In the final competition of the eighth edition of the international beauty pageant Miss Earth, Odemba was announced as one of sixteen semi-finalists who would move forward to compete for the title. She achieved one of the eight highest scores in the swimsuit competition for her stage chops, which advanced her as one of the top eight finalists to participate in the evening gown competition. She then pulled away for the lead as she articulated in her video interview about environmental concerns as a key issue in her country, in which she advanced to the top four.

In the last round, the court of four were asked one question, “What would you tell US president-elect Barack Obama about the state of the global environment if ever you were to meet him?” She placed the second highest score in the interview round and at the conclusion of the competition, she was crowned Miss Earth Air.

A parade and press conference were given for winning Miss Earth Air 2008. The Miss Earth pageant was held on November 9, 2008 at the Clark Expo Amphitheater in Angeles, Pampanga, Philippines. Eighty-five delegates arrived from October 19, 2008 in the Philippines. The pageant was broadcast live via ABS-CBN in the Philippines and to many countries worldwide via Star World, The Filipino Channel and other partner networks.

Odemba's closest friend among the Miss Earth 2008 top four runner-up winners—named after the four elements—is her pageant roommate Karla Henry, Miss Earth 2008 from the Philippines. They plan to climb Mount Kilimanjaro together.

References

External links
Miss Earth Official Website

1983 births
Living people
Miss Earth 2008 contestants
Tanzanian female models
Tanzanian beauty pageant winners
People from Arusha District